The 2009–10 Hofstra Pride men's basketball team represented Hofstra University in the 2009–10 NCAA Division I men's basketball season. The Pride were led by head coach Tom Pecora in his ninth year leading the team. Hofstra played their home games at Mack Sports Complex in Hempstead, New York, as members of the Colonial Athletic Association. 

The Pride finished conference play with a 10–8 record, earning the seventh seed in the CAA tournament. Hofstra won its first-round game, but were defeated in the quarterfinals by Northeastern.

Boston University failed to qualify for the NCAA tournament, but were invited to the 2010 College Basketball Invitational. The Pride were eliminated in the first round of the CBI by IUPUI, 74–60.

This was Pecora's final season as head coach of the Pride. One week after the end of Hofstra's season, Pecora was hired as head coach of the Fordham Rams.

The Pride finished the season with a 19–15 record.

Roster 

Source

Schedule and results

|-
!colspan=9 style=|Regular season

|-
!colspan=9 style=| CAA tournament

|-
!colspan=9 style=| CBI

References

Hofstra Pride men's basketball seasons
Hofstra
Hofstra
Hofstra men's basketball
Hofstra men's basketball